List of Ministers of Communications and Works of the Republic of Cyprus since Independence in 1959:

References

External links 
 Official list of the Ministry of Communications and Works of Cyprus

Communications